Copelatus karnatakus is a species of diving beetle. It is part of the genus Copelatus in the subfamily Copelatinae of the family Dytiscidae. It was described by Holmen & Vazirani in 1990.

References

karnatakus
Beetles described in 1990